Events in the year 1892 in Bulgaria.

Incumbents

Events 

 Bolyarka, a Bulgarian beer brand from the city of Veliko Tarnovo, was founded by the HadjiSlavchevi brothers.

References 

 
1890s in Bulgaria
Years of the 20th century in Bulgaria
Bulgaria
Bulgaria